Ibestad is a municipality in Troms og Finnmark county, Norway. It is part of the traditional region of Central Hålogaland. The administrative centre of the municipality is the village of Hamnvik. Some of the other larger villages in Ibestad include Engenes, Laupstad, Rollnes, Sørrollnes, Sørvika, and Å.

The  municipality is the 292nd largest by area out of the 356 municipalities in Norway.

General information

The municipality of Ibestad was established on 1 January 1838 (see formannskapsdistrikt law). Initially, Ibestad municipality covered a large area from the Vågsfjorden to the border with Sweden (the old Astafjord church parish). In 1854, the rural eastern half of the municipality (population: 757) was separated from Ibestad to form the new Bardu Municipality. This left Ibestad with 4,741 residents.

Then, on 1 January 1871, the northeastern part of the municipality (population: 1,384) was separated from Ibestad to form the new Salangen Municipality. This left Ibestad with 4,301 inhabitants. On 1 January 1907, the easternmost area of Ibestad (population: 1,536) became the separate Lavangen Municipality. Ibestad had  5,709 residents remaining after the split. In 1926, the municipality of Ibestad was divided into four separate municipalities: Andørja (population: 1,420) in the northeast, Gratangen (population: 1,967) in the southeast, Astafjord (population: 1,018) in the southwest, and (a much smaller) Ibestad (population: 1,768) in the northwest.

During the 1960s, there were many municipal mergers across Norway due to the work of the Schei Committee. On 1 January 1964, the municipality of Ibestad (population: 1,821) was merged with the municipality of Andørja (population: 1,330) and the part of Skånland Municipality located on the island of Rolla (population: 143), creating a new Ibestad Municipality with a total of 3,294 residents.

On 1 January 2020, the municipality became part of the newly formed Troms og Finnmark county. Previously, it had been part of the old Troms county.

Name
The municipality (originally the parish) is named after the old Ibestad farm since the first Ibestad Church was built there. The first element is the genitive case of the male name . Prior to 1918, the name was spelled Ibbestad.

Coat of arms
The coat of arms was granted on 19 December 1986. The official blazon is "Azure, a cross formy within and conjoined to an annulet argent". This means the arms have a blue field (background) and the charge is a cross formy inside an annulet (circle). The charge has a tincture of argent which means it is commonly colored white, but if it is made out of metal, then silver is used. The design is reminiscent of the Ibestad Church, built around the year 1200. It is one of the northernmost stone churches in the world. In the 1960s a 13th-century gravestone was found at the church which had the same type of "wheel cross" design. This design was eventually chosen for the Ibestad coat of arms. These types of crosses were often used as ornaments in wooden stave churches. The arms were designed by Steinar Hanssen.

Churches
The Church of Norway has two parishes within the municipality of Ibestad. It is part of the Trondenes prosti (deanery) in the Diocese of Nord-Hålogaland.

Geography
The municipality encompasses the islands of Andørja and Rolla and the tiny surrounding islets. The two main islands are connected by the undersea Ibestad Tunnel. The Mjøsund Bridge connects Andørja to Salangen Municipality on the mainland. There is a regular ferry connection from Sørrollnes on Rolla to the town of Harstad.

The Astafjorden forms the southeastern border of the municipality and the Vågsfjorden forms the western and northern borders. The small Mjøsundet strait forms the eastern border.

Climate

Government
All municipalities in Norway, including Ibestad, are responsible for primary education (through 10th grade), outpatient health services, senior citizen services, unemployment and other social services, zoning, economic development, and municipal roads. The municipality is governed by a municipal council of elected representatives, which in turn elect a mayor.  The municipality falls under the Trondenes District Court and the Hålogaland Court of Appeal.

Municipal council
The municipal council  of Ibestad is made up of 19 representatives that are elected to four year terms. The party breakdown of the council is as follows:

Mayors
The mayors of Ibestad:

1838–1845: Peter Munch Brager 
1846–1847: Poul Irgens Holst 
1848–1849: Nikolai Normann Dons 
1850–1855: Jørris Schjelderup Hanssen
1856–1857: Jens Bing Dons, Jr.
1858–1862: Fredrik Hegge
1863–1868: Jens Bing Dons, Jr.
1869–1872: Peder B. Dons 
1873–1876: Johan Barak Dønnesen 
1877–1880: Peder B. Dons 
1881–1882: Konrad Saugestad 
1883–1884: Andreas Simon Olsen 
1885–1888: Konrad Saugestad 
1889–1890: Peder B. Dons
1891–1898: Konrad Saugestad  
1899–1907: Johan Laurits Johansen 
1908–1910: Helge Hallesen (V)
1911–1913: Martin Rasmussen (V)
1914–1919: John Lind-Johansen (Ap)
1923–1940: Håkon Breivoll (Ap)
1941–1945: Fridtjof Kjæreng (NS)
1945-1945: Håkon Breivoll (Ap)
1946–1953: Hans Simonsen (Ap)
1954–1957: Einar Horsberg (V)
1957–1959: Hans Simonsen (Ap)
1960–1961: Einar Horsberg (V)
1962–1963: Ove Bergvoll (Ap)
1964–1967: Olav Eriksen (Ap)
1968–1975: Peder H. Pedersen (Sp)
1976–1979: Odd Jacobsen (Ap)
1980–1983: Peder H. Pedersen (Sp)
1984–2007: Arne Olav Ekman (H)
2007–2011: Marit Johansen (Ap)
2011–present: Dag Brustind (H)

Notable people 
 Håkon Martin Breivoll (1886 in Ibestad – 1955) a Norwegian politician, Mayor of Ibestad municipality from 1922 to 1940

References

External links

Municipal fact sheet from Statistics Norway 

 
Municipalities of Troms og Finnmark
Populated places of Arctic Norway
1838 establishments in Norway